The Tent is a 2020 American thriller film directed by Kyle Couch, starring Tim Kaiser and Lulu Dahl.

Cast
 Tim Kaiser as David
 Lulu Dahl as Mary
 Shelby Bradley as Anne
 Christine Marie as Christine
 Jeannine Thompson as Grace
 Jeff Kaiser as Jesse
 Kyle Couch as Gabriel

Reception
Bobby LePire of Film Threat gave the film a score of 9/10 and wrote that while the film has "a few minor structural issues", Kaiser and Dahl are "perfectly matched to each other and deliver fantastic performances", the cinematography is "excellent", the sound design is "some of the best".

Jeremy Dick of MovieWeb wrote that while the film is "light on fright", it is "heavy on emotion", and called the performances "excellent".

Joel Harley of Starburst rated the film 3 stars out of 5 and wrote that while the film is "shabby and unassuming", it is "gets the job done."

References

External links
 
 

American thriller films
2020 thriller  films
2020 films